Patrik Hasler may refer to:
 Patrik Hasler (skier)
 Patrik Hasler (snowboarder)